Sheatown is a census-designated place (CDP) in Newport Township, Luzerne County, Pennsylvania, United States. It is adjacent to the west side of the city of Nanticoke. The population of Sheatown was 671 at the 2010 census.

Geography
It is directly west of the city of Nanticoke.

References

Census-designated places in Luzerne County, Pennsylvania
Census-designated places in Pennsylvania